is a train station in Kita-ku, Niigata, Niigata Prefecture, Japan, operated by East Japan Railway Company (JR East).  It is also a freight terminal for the Japan Freight Railway Company.

Lines
Kuroyama Station is served by the Hakushin Line, and is 18.0 kilometers from the starting point of the line at Niigata Station.

Layout
The station consists of two ground-level opposed side platforms connected by a footbridge, serving two tracks. The station is unattended.

Platforms

History
The station opened on 11 February 1957. With the privatization of Japanese National Railways (JNR) on 1 April 1987, the station came under the control of JR East.

Surrounding area
The station is located in a semi-rural residential area.

See also
 List of railway stations in Japan

External links

 JR East station information 

Railway stations in Niigata (city)
Hakushin Line
Railway stations in Japan opened in 1957
Stations of East Japan Railway Company
Stations of Japan Freight Railway Company